Garrett Island may refer to:

Garrett Island (Nunavut), in the Barrow Strait
Garrett Island (Maryland), in the Susquehanna River